Manor Water is a river in the parish of Manor, Peeblesshire in the Scottish Borders. It rises in the Ettrick Forest and flows down through the Maynor valley, passing the various farms and hamlets of Maynor as well as Kirkton Manynor, where the Maynor kirk and village hall are flowing into the River Tweed one mile south of Peebles at Olde Maynor Brig, which is closed to traffic for the foreseeable future.

See also
List of places in the Scottish Borders
List of places in Scotland
List of rivers of Scotland

External links
CRCAHMS/Canmore record: Old Manor Bridge, Manor Water
Gazetteer for Scotland: Manor Water
Streetmap of Manor Water
Borders Family History Society: Manor

Tributaries of the River Tweed
1Manor